As Ugly as They Wanna Be is an EP by the American heavy metal band Ugly Kid Joe. It was released in 1991. The title of the album is a parody of 2 Live Crew's 1989 album As Nasty as They Wanna Be.

As Ugly as They Wanna Be is notable for being the first EP to be certified multi-platinum by the RIAA.

EP information
Two tracks "Madman" and "Everything About You" later appeared on the band's 1992 debut album America's Least Wanted with only little changes (new vocal track on "Madman" and spoken intro on "Everything About You"). "Everything About You" later became a hit single and was used in the movie Wayne's World, which was released the following year.

The track "Sweet Leaf" is a cover of the British heavy metal band Black Sabbath.

Track listing
 "Madman" – 3:37
 "Whiplash Liquor" – 3:40
 "Too Bad" – 5:54
 "Everything About You" – 4:14
 "Sweet Leaf"/"Funky Fresh Country Club" – 7:31
 "Heavy Metal" – 0:25

Charts

Weekly charts

Year-end charts

Singles

References

Ugly Kid Joe albums
1991 debut EPs